Peter Graves (born October 25, 1984) is an American rower. He competed in the men's quadruple sculls event at the 2012 Summer Olympics.

References

External links
 

1984 births
Living people
American male rowers
Olympic rowers of the United States
Rowers at the 2012 Summer Olympics
Sportspeople from Cincinnati